The Chhattisgarh women's cricket team is a women's cricket team that represents the Indian state of Chhattisgarh. The team competes in the Women's Senior One Day Trophy and the Women's Senior T20 Trophy.

See also
 Chhattisgarh cricket team

References

2016 establishments in Chhattisgarh
Cricket in Chhattisgarh
Women's cricket teams in India